Heinrich Doergangk (Cologne, second half of the 16th century - before 1626) was a German Hispanist and grammarian.

An advocate of Roman Catholicism, he wrote in Latin a Spanish grammar titled Institutiones in linguam hispanicam, admodum faciles, quales antehac nunquam visae (Coloniae, 1614), where he attacks Protestantism.

References

Writers from Cologne
German Hispanists
Grammarians from Germany
Linguists of Spanish
16th-century philologists
17th-century philologists